Bahmanabad (also Romanized as Bahmanābād; also known as Hajī Bahman) is a village in Howmeh Rural District, in the Central District of Behbahan County, Khuzestan Province, Iran. At the 2006 census, its population was 15, in 4 families.

References 

Populated places in Behbahan County